Boar's Breath is a bar & grill located on Lakeshore Drive in Clearlake, California.

History and description
In 1994 Frank Stephenson opened the original Boar's Breath, a fine dining restaurant, on Calistoga road in Middletown where it operated for 21 years until the 2015 Valley Fire forced him to move to a smaller building on the shore of Clear Lake in Clearlake. In an effort to simplify and because Stephenson was "tired" of fine dining, the restaurant switched to serving barbecue dishes such as burgers and ribs. The change in menu "wasn't exactly planned" according to Stephenson and was the result of running out of money during the move and the subsequent reuse of an old "BBQ" banner leftover from a catering job. Stephenson spent the remainder of the year remodeling the interior of an old drive-through coffee shop and ordering and hauling a custom-built meat smoker from Houston.

References

Restaurants established in 1994
Clearlake, California
1994 establishments in California
Companies based in Lake County, California